Attel Abbey, also Attl Abbey ( or Attl), was a Benedictine monastery, later a home for the disabled run by the Brothers Hospitallers, in the village of Attel near Wasserburg am Inn in Bavaria, Germany.

History
The monastery, dedicated to the Virgin Mary and Saint Michael, was founded as a Benedictine abbey by Count Arnold of Diessen-Andechs in around 1037.

It was dissolved in 1803 in the secularisation of Bavaria. The abbey buildings were partly demolished, partly acquired by private owners.

In 1874 the Bavarian government set up a home for disabled men in the remaining premises, the running of which they entrusted to the Order of the Brothers Hospitallers. Apart from the years of World War II, when under the National Socialist government the Brothers were obliged to close the home and leave, they remained here until 1970, when declining numbers forced them to give up Attel. The running of the home was taken over by the Charity Union of München-Freising until 1994, when it became independently managed.

References

Further reading
 Hugo Schnell: Pfarrkirche Attel am Inn. Dreifaltigkeitsverlag, München 1934
 Ernst Götz et al. (eds.): Handbuch der deutschen Kunstdenkmäler, Bayern IV: München und Oberbayern. 3rd edition. Deutscher Kunstverlag, München/Berlin 2006, pp. 65–66 
 807-2007. 1200 Jahre Attel, Jubiläumsschrift (= "Heimat am Inn" 26/27, 2006–2007)

External links
   Klöster in Bayern: Attel

Benedictine monasteries in Germany
Monasteries in Bavaria
1030s establishments in the Holy Roman Empire
Christian monasteries established in the 11th century
1803 disestablishments in the Holy Roman Empire